Álvaro Bravo Jiménez (born 4 February 1998) is a Spanish professional footballer who plays as a midfielder for CF Fuenlabrada.

Club career
Born in Pinto, Community of Madrid, Bravo joined Real Madrid's La Fábrica in 2006, from hometown side CA Pinto. On 14 July 2017, after finishing his formation, he was loaned to neighbouring CF Fuenlabrada in Segunda División B, for one year.

Bravo made his senior debut on 20 August 2017, coming on as a late substitute for Hugo Fraile in a 1–2 home loss against Deportivo Fabril. He contributed with 22 appearances during the campaign, as his side missed out promotion in the play-offs.

On 23 August 2018, Bravo joined fellow third division side CD Mirandés on loan for one year. He helped the side to achieve promotion to Segunda División, and subsequently returned to Los Blancos in July 2019, being assigned to the B-team in the third tier.

On 17 July 2020, Bravo agreed to a three-year contract with Granada CF, being initially assigned to the reserves still in division three. He made his first team – and La Liga – debut on 8 November, replacing Jorge Molina in a 0–2 away loss against Real Sociedad, as his side was heavily impacted by the COVID-19 pandemic.

On 26 November 2021, free agent Bravo returned to Fuenla, signing a two-year contract with the club now in Segunda División.

International career
Bravo represented Spain at under-16 level in 2013, playing one match for the side.

References

External links
Real Madrid profile

1998 births
Living people
Footballers from Madrid
Spanish footballers
Spain youth international footballers
Association football midfielders
La Liga players
Segunda División players
Segunda División B players
Real Madrid Castilla footballers
CF Fuenlabrada footballers
CD Mirandés footballers
Club Recreativo Granada players
Granada CF footballers